Kati Wolf (born 24 September 1974) is a Hungarian singer. Wolf represented Hungary at the Eurovision Song Contest 2011 with the song "What About My Dreams?".

At the age of seven, Wolf sang the title track for the popular Hungarian cartoon Vuk. Besides singing, she also took piano and jazz dance classes. After her graduation as solfège teacher, chorus master at the Hungarian Music Academy, she worked with numerous bands in different genres. Her breakthrough came in 2010 as a finalist of the Hungarian version of the talent show X-Faktor. Prior to X-Faktor she worked as an airline purser.

On 10 December 2014, it was announced that Wolf would take part in A Dal, the national selection implemented the year after she participated, with the song  "Ne engedj el!" in hopes of representing Hungary in the Eurovision Song Contest 2015. She was previously a judge in the 2012 edition of the national final. Kati got to the final, but did not qualify for the superfinal.

Discography

Albums 
 Wolf-áramlat (2009)
 Az első X — 10 dal az élő showból (2011)
 Vár a holnap (2011)

Charted singles

Other single releases 

 "Vuk dala" (1981)

References

External links 

 

1974 births
Living people
People from Szentendre
Eurovision Song Contest entrants of 2011
21st-century Hungarian women singers
The X Factor contestants
Flight attendants
Eurovision Song Contest entrants for Hungary